The Villupuram Junction–Puducherry (Pondy) branch line is a single electrified railway line run from Viluppuram Junction, where it split off the Chennai Egmore–Thanjavur main line,  and Puducherry.

History
The line was originally built in the late ninteeth century and crossed between British and French territory at the Sankaraparani River. It opened on 16 December 1879. The line once had spur to major textile mill in Pondicherry as well as to its port. Before broad gauge conversion, trains between Puducherry and Villupuram halted at Palliyaneliyanur.

As of 2019, there are plans to develop the intermediate station infrastructure to increase capacity on the line.

Services
The branch line serves superfast express trains bound for Howrah, Bhubaneswar, and New Delhi. There are also standard express trains serving several destinations, and local trains that run among the whole branch line.

Stations

Viluppuram Junction
Located in Villupuram, Tamil Nadu, Viluppuram Junction railway station is where the branch line connects with the main line and several other branch lines that originate there.

Valavanur
Valavanur station is located in the Viluppuram district of the Indian state of Tamil Nadu, India. It was once an import depot for the shipment of peanut oil.

The station consists of 1 platform on a single track. As of 2019 there were plans to expand the station with a line block and siding to accommodate through service trains.

Chinna Babu Samudram

Chinna Babu Samudram station is also located in the Viluppuram district. It was a former customs hub between the former British and French territories. The station has three tracks, with a single side platform serving the southernmost track.

Villianur

Villianur station serves the town of Villianur. It consists of a single side platform serving a single track. Like with Valavanur station, there are plans to implement a line block at this station.

Puducherry
The Puducherry railway station, located in Pondicherry, is the terminus station.

References

External links
 Villupuram–Puducherry line India Rail Info
 Metric Musings IRFCA Villupuram Jn. - Pondicherry M.G. Branch October 1967
 Villupuram–Puducherry trains ICRTC


Trichy railway division
Rail transport in Tamil Nadu
Railway lines opened in 1879
Rail transport in Puducherry